Crane Conservation Center and Wildlife Park, Lakki Marwat is a conservation center for the captive breeding of various types of wild birds and animal species. It was established in 2007. The center is equipped with a total of 15 circular aviaries and 20 cages as well as an education block for visitors. The center is now maintained and operated by Khyber Pakhtunkhwa Wildlife Department through the Bannu Wildlife Division, Bannu while its establishment was funded by WWF - Pakistan, GEF, UNDP and Darwin Initiative. A "Range Officer" of the wildlife department manages and co-ordinates the activities of the park. A wildlife veterinarian, Adnan Khan, frequently visits the center in order to maintain healthy stock.

Lakki Marwat is a seasonal migratory route for cranes. Many residents in nearby towns and villages keep a number of cranes in captivity. These cranes are captured from the wild using stone-weighted ropes tossed up into flocks attracted to live decoys. The programme also aims to teach the advanced breeding methods to these breeders as part of conservation of endangered species of common crane. The total area of the park is 150 kanals.

The Khyber Pakhtunkhwa Wildlife Department has established a Crane Conservation Centre and Wildlife park in Bannu Wildlife division. The site fulfills the following major objectives:

To rehabilitate endangered species under semi natural conditions.
To protect indigenous plants, birds and animals species.
To develop a gene pool of endangered wildlife species.
To raise the socio economic condition of the local people by promoting eco-tourism and providing job opportunities.
To create awareness amongst the local community especially the school students and general public.

The following species of birds and animals are present in the park.

Pheasants
 Silver Pheasant (Lophura nycthemera)
 Golden Pheasant

Peacocks
White spp
Cameo spp
Blue spp
Indian Blue spp
Black Shoulder spp
Pied spp
Purple neck spp

Cranes
Common crane
Demoiselle crane
Black crowned crane
Grey crowned crane

Ducks and geese
Ruddy shelduck
Bar-headed goose
Gadwall
Mallard duck
Wigeon
Northern shoveler
Northern pintail

Flamingoes (Phoenicopterus)

Mammals

Chinkara
Blackbuck
Urial (Ovis vignei)
Hog deer

References

Lakki Marwat District
Nature conservation organisations based in Pakistan
Bird sanctuaries
Wildlife conservation in Pakistan
Bird conservation organizations
Animal welfare organisations based in Pakistan